Overby is a surname. Notable people with the surname include:

Christian Overby (born 1985), Danish footballer
Håkon Øverby (born 1941), retired Norwegian sport wrestler
Jason Overby (born 1975), American artist and critic
Lacy Overby (1920-1994), virologist

See also
Overbye